Tashtugay (Taştuğay) is a rural locality (a village) in Tanalyksky Selsoviet, Khaybullinsky District, Bashkortostan, Russia. The population was 358 as of 2010. There are 3 streets.

Geography 
Tashtugay is located 40 km northeast of Akyar (the district's administrative centre) by road. Bakalovka is the nearest rural locality.

References 

Rural localities in Khaybullinsky District